Symbiote may refer to:
 Symbiote (comics), a fictional alien species in Marvel Comics
 Symbiont, an organism living in symbiosis with another
 Symbiotes (beetle), a genus of beetles
 Symbiotes (bacterium), a genus of bacteria

See also
 Symbiosis (disambiguation)